Apriltsi Municipality is a municipality (obshtina) in Lovech Province, Central-North Bulgaria, located from the northern slopes  of the central Stara planina mountain to the area of the Fore-Balkan. It is named after its administrative centre - the town of Apriltsi.

The area covers parts of the Central Balkan National Park which is listed as Category 2 by The World Conservation Union (IUCN).

Settlements 

Apriltsi Municipality includes the following 4 places (towns are shown in bold):

Demography 
The following table shows the change of the population during the last four decades.

Religion 
According to the latest Bulgarian census of 2011, the religious composition, among those who answered the optional question on religious identification, was the following:

See also
Provinces of Bulgaria
Municipalities of Bulgaria
List of cities and towns in Bulgaria

References

External links
 Official website 
 Apriltsi Info Portal  

Municipalities in Lovech Province